Barry Jones is the name of:

Barry Jones (actor) (1893–1981), British-born actor
Barry Jones (Australian politician) (born 1932), member of the ALP
Barry Jones, Baron Jones (born 1939), British politician
Barry Jones (Canadian politician) (born 1940)
Barry Jones (bishop) (1941–2016), ninth Bishop of Christchurch, New Zealand
Barry Jones (cricketer) (born 1955), English cricketer; played for Worcestershire, 1976–1980
Barry Jones (baseball) (born 1963), former Major League Baseball pitcher
Barry Jones (outfielder) (born 1965), American professional baseball player and manager (See 1990 Caribbean Series)
Barry Jones (footballer) (born 1970), formerly of Wrexham and York City
Barry Jones (boxer) (born 1974), British boxer and WBO Super featherweight Champion
Barry Jones (magician) (born 1980), Scottish magician
Barry Jones (executive), former chief executive of the Australian Petroleum Production and Exploration Association